The title Countess of Warwick may be given either to a female heir of the Earl of Warwick or to the wife of the Earl of Warwick. The title has been held by several women, including:

Countesses suo iure
Margaret de Newburg, 7th Countess of Warwick (died 1253)
Anne de Beauchamp, 15th Countess of Warwick (1443-1448)
Anne Beauchamp, 16th Countess of Warwick (1426-1492)

Countesses by marriage
Gundreda de Warenne, Countess of Warwick (died before 1184)
Matilda de Percy, Countess of Warwick (died 1204)
Philippa Basset, Countess of Warwick (died 1265)
Maud FitzJohn, Countess of Warwick (c.1238-1301)
Alice de Toeni, Countess of Warwick (1284-1325)
Katherine Mortimer, Countess of Warwick (1314-1369)
Elizabeth de Berkeley, Countess of Warwick (1386-1422)
Isabel le Despenser, Countess of Worcester (1400-1439)
Cecily Neville, Duchess of Warwick (c.1425-1450)
Jane Dudley, Duchess of Northumberland (1508–1555) (also Countess of Warwick)
Anne Seymour, Countess of Warwick (1538-1588)
Anne Russell, Countess of Warwick (1549-1604)
Mary Rich, Countess of Warwick (1625-1678)
Charlotte Rich, Countess of Warwick (1680-1731)
Elizabeth Greville, Countess of Warwick (c.1721-1800)
Sarah Greville, Countess of Warwick (1786-1851)
Anne Greville, Countess of Warwick (1829-1903)
Daisy Greville, Countess of Warwick (1861-1938)